Pratap Singh II  (27 July 1724 – 10 January 1754), was the Maharana of Mewar Kingdom (r. 1751–1754).

References 

Mewar dynasty
1724 births
1754 deaths